Poeciloterpa is a genus of froghoppers in the family Cercopidae. Endemic to the Philippines, there are about 13 described species in Poeciloterpa.

Species
Poeciloterpa contains the following species:
Poeciloterpa altissima Crispolon & Soulier-Perkins, sp. nov.
Poeciloterpa atra Jacobi, 1927
Poeciloterpa conica Crispolon & Soulier-Perkins, sp. nov.
Poeciloterpa fusca Lallemand, 1927
Poeciloterpa gapudi Crispolon & Yap, sp. nov.
Poeciloterpa latipennis Schmidt, 1920
Poeciloterpa mangkas Crispolon & Yap, sp. nov.
Poeciloterpa minuta Lallemand, 1922
Poeciloterpa montana Schmidt, 1927
Poeciloterpa nigrolimbata Stål, 1870
Poeciloterpa obscura Schmidt, 1927
Poeciloterpa rufolimbata Schmidt, 1927
Poeciloterpa unicolor Lallemand, 1922

References

External links
 BioLib

Cercopidae
Insects described in 1870
Insects of the Philippines